The Campeonato Argentino de Mayores (also known as Campeonato Argentino) was an annual rugby union competition held in Argentina for provincial teams. The Campeonato Argentino was strictly amateur, and only players from local clubs were allowed to play. It was organised by the Argentine Rugby Union (UAR), with the last season held in 2017.

The competing teams represented the unions of the rugby provinces that make up the Argentine Rugby Union (UAR). Some of these unions represented more than one province, for example the "Noreste" (North east) side represented the provinces of Chaco and Corrientes. Other unions  represented only a part of a province, most notably the unions that make up the province of Buenos Aires and also the unions of Santa Fe and Rosario, both within the borders of the province of Santa Fe.

In the 2012 edition, the national teams of Chile and Uruguay participated at the Zona Campeonato, while the national teams of Brazil and Paraguay played in the third level.

Also in 2015 Uruguay enters in the competition with a team at Zona Ascenso. The same for Paraguay, from in 2016, in order to compete in Super 9.

Format
The competition was made up of three divisions:
 Zona Campeonato, which contained the 8 best unions; 
 Zona Ascenso, with the next best 8 teams divided in two pools, with the winner of each pool playing off against one of the bottom two teams of the higher level for promotion to the Zona Campeonato. The bottom team in each pool played off, the loser being relegated to Zona Estímulo.
 Super 9 (or Zona Estímulo) with 9 teams. The winner was promoted to Zona Ascenso.

Teams
Unions participating in the last season ("Zona Campeonato") held in 2017 were:

List of champions 
Since the first championship held in 1945 to the last season:

Titles by team

Notes

References 

 
C
C
C
C
1945 establishments in Argentina
2017 disestablishments in Argentina
Sports leagues established in 1945
Sports leagues disestablished in 2017